The Pennsylvania Coalition Against Rape (PCAR) is the oldest anti-rape coalition in the United States, working to eliminate all forms of sexual violence and advocating for the rights and needs of victims. Founded in 1975, PCAR works with a statewide network of 51 rape crisis centers serving all 67 counties to provide services to survivors of sexual violence.

References

External links
 

1975 establishments in Pennsylvania
Organizations based in Pennsylvania
Organizations established in 1975
Rape in the United States
Sexual abuse advocacy and support groups
Violence in Pennsylvania
History of women in Pennsylvania